Lahelle is a neighborhood and statistical area (grunnkrets) in Sandefjord municipality, Norway. It is the innermost part of the 5 km Lahellefjord. It was formerly spelled Ladhella, which includes the word lada, translating to loading or unloading vessels. The last section, -hella, most likely referred to the flat mountains. Boats were previously constructed at Lahelle, including Verven in Søndre- and Nordre Lahelle. The oldest remaining house at Lahelle is dated to 1853. A shipyard was previously located here and was utilized for repair and construction of sailing ships. The area is now made up of a mixture of homes and vacation homes. There are several piers here along with sandy beaches.

The statistical area Lahelle, which also can include the peripheral parts of the village as well as the surrounding countryside, has a population of 208.

Lahelle is located on the northern Østerøya peninsula, west of Gokstad borough. It is considered a part of the urban settlement Sandefjord, which covers the greater Sandefjord city area and stretches towards Stokke and into peripheral parts of Larvik municipality. The urban settlement Sandefjord has a population of 39,849, of which 39,144 people live within Sandefjord.

Not to be confused with Lahelle on Nøtterøy Island, Lahelle in Lier, or Lahelle in Glemminge in Østfold County.

History
Lahelle first gained importance in the 1800s when shipyards were established at Lahelle. For a limited time, it also became a port of call for steamships. Lahelle is also where the Gokstad Ship was moved onto barges in 1880 and transported to Kristiania.

References

Villages in Vestfold og Telemark